Skeleton Coast is a 2006 novel by Clive Cussler and Jack B. Du Brul and the fourth installment in the Oregon Files series. It involves Juan Cabrillo and his crew of concerned mercenaries, as they attempt to quell a revolution, support and spark another, and save the East Coast of America from widespread infection and illness.

Plot
The book begins with a brief chapter detailing the traversing of a section of the Kalahari Desert by a group of four Europeans, led by the experienced guide H. A. Ryder. The text tells of how they survive the desert thanks to Ryder's skills, but are being pursued by more than one hundred of the Herero King's best men, due to the Europeans stealing their hard-won diamonds. The chapter ends with the Europeans meeting with their escape ship, HMS Rove only to find it stranded on the coast. Simultaneously, the Herero attack the ship, killing the Europeans (presumably) while a massive sandstorm rages around them, reshaping the coastline and burying the Rove under hundreds of feet of sand, lost for eternity.

The story continues with the Oregon (a high-tech modernized ship carrying heavy weaponry but usually masquerading as a dilapidated freighter) meeting with the leader of the Congolese Army of Revolution, Makombo. They 'agree' to trade 500 AK-47's, 200 RPGs, fifty RPG launchers and 50,000 rounds of Warsaw Pact 7.62mm ammunition in return for a quarter pound of rough (blood) diamonds. These weapons are then stolen by the rebels after double-crossing Cabrillo before the Oregon's crew had the chance to do the same to them. 

After narrowly escaping from those individuals, the Oregon begins to track the location of the weapons in the hope that they can seize them once again. In addition to this they also hear that a billionaire with a controversial product has been kidnapped. They take up the quest to free him. During this operation Juan is nearly stranded in the desert, but manages to travel by parasurfing his way back to civilization. 

After rescuing the billionaire, they find out that his former partner is planning to dump millions of litres of toxic crude oil into the ocean in order to enlighten the world about the environmental effects that our continued ignorance is causing. Luckily, the Oregon and crew do battle (oddly enough it's the Congo revolutionaries) with the bad guys and save the planet. 

The conclusion involves giving the rightful owners billions of dollars worth of diamonds that will allow them to free Zimbabwe from the evil regime that is currently in place.

References

2006 American novels
The Oregon Files
American thriller novels

Novels by Clive Cussler
Novels by Jack Du Brul
Berkley Books books
Collaborative novels